Liu Huaqiu (November 1939 – 18 November 2022) was a Chinese politician. He was a representative of the 13th National Congress of the Chinese Communist Party. He was an alternate member of the 14th Central Committee of the Chinese Communist Party. He was a member of the 15th and 16th Central Committee of the Chinese Communist Party. He was a member of the 10th National Committee of the Chinese People's Political Consultative Conference.

Biography
Liu was born in Wuchuan County (now Wuchuan), Guangdong, in November 1939. In 1965, he graduated from China Foreign Affairs University and joined the Chinese Communist Party in that same year. He joined the Foreign Service after university. In September 1989, he was elevated to vice minister of Foreign Affairs, responsible for the Americas and Oceania. He also served as director of the Office of the Central Foreign Affairs Working Committee (later reshuffled as Central Foreign Affairs Office and then Office of the Central Leading Group for Foreign Affairs and Office of the Central Leading Group for National Security) between November 1994 and April 2005. In February 2005, he took office as vice chairperson of Foreign Affairs Committee of the 10th Chinese People's Political Consultative Conference.

Liu died from COVID-19 in 2022.

References

1939 births
2022 deaths
People from Zhanjiang
China Foreign Affairs University alumni
People's Republic of China politicians from Guangdong
Chinese Communist Party politicians from Guangdong
Vice-ministers of the Ministry of Foreign Affairs of the People's Republic of China
Members of the 10th Chinese People's Political Consultative Conference
Alternate members of the 14th Central Committee of the Chinese Communist Party    
Members of the 15th Central Committee of the Chinese Communist Party
Members of the 16th Central Committee of the Chinese Communist Party
Deaths from the COVID-19 pandemic in China